The 2001 Dakar Rally, also known as the 2001 Paris–Dakar Rally, was the 23rd running of the Dakar Rally event. The format was revised to reduce the amount of airborne assistance to competitors in favour of assistance vehicles. This was the last Paris-Dakar Rally that commenced and finished in the same locations as the original race. Jean-Louis Schlesser won the penultimate stage of the rally to take the lead but was penalised one hour for unsportsmanlike conduct. The rally was won by German Jutta Kleinschmidt, who became the first woman to win the event. The motorcycle class of the rally was won by Italian Fabrizio Meoni, with Karel Loprais	winning the truck class.

On stage 19, teammates Schlesser and Servia started the stage earlier than scheduled, which meant that race leader Masuoka was left behind the trail of the two buggies. As Masuoka drove off track to overtake Servia, the car was damaged. Masuoka's co-driver, Pascal Maimon, walked to the track to try to stop Servia to complain, Servia braked and nearly ran over him. Schlesser and Servia were given a 60-minute penalty, which gave Kleinschmidt and Masuoka a comfortable lead for the final mini stage.

Stages

  - Stage cancelled for bikes only due to a sanctioning fee dispute between the race organisers and the Spanish Motorcycle Federation.
  - Jean-Louis Schlesser set the fastest time for the stage, but was penalised 1 hour and 6 minutes for starting the stage early, along with teammate Jose Maria Servia.

Stage Results

Motorcycles

 Source:

Cars

Trucks

Final standings

Motorcycles

Cars

Trucks

References

Dakar Rally
D
Dakar Rally, 2001
2001 in French motorsport